Fowji (also Romanized as Fowjī) is a village in Soltanabad Rural District, in the Central District of Khoshab County, Razavi Khorasan Province, Iran. At the 2006 census, its population was 271, in 64 families.

References 

Populated places in Khoshab County